The 1980 season was the 75th season of competitive football in Norway.

Men's football

League season

Promotion and relegation

1. divisjon

Start won the championship, their second league title.

2. divisjon

Group A

Group B

3. divisjon

Norwegian Cup

Final

Women's football

Norwegian Women's Cup

Final
BUL 1–1 (a.e.t.) Trondheims-Ørn

Replay
BUL 2–0 Trondheims-Ørn

UEFA competitions

European Cup

First round

|}

European Cup Winners' Cup

First round

|}

Second round

|}

UEFA Cup

First round

|}

National teams

Norway men's national football team

Results
Sources:

Norway women's national football team

Results
Source:

References

External links
 Norge Menn Senior A, Football Association of Norway 1908–present
 RSSSF.no – National team 1980

 
Seasons in Norwegian football